Eduardo Alonso (born 2 January 1899, date of death unknown) was a Cuban fencer. He competed in the individual and team épée competitions at the 1924 Summer Olympics.

References

External links
 

1899 births
Year of death missing
Cuban male fencers
Olympic fencers of Cuba
Fencers at the 1924 Summer Olympics
People from Havana